Mathieu Alexandre Dandenault (born February 3, 1976) is a Canadian former professional ice hockey defenceman. He played for the Detroit Red Wings and the Montreal Canadiens in the National Hockey League (NHL).

He was a member of the 1997, 1998, and 2002 Stanley Cup winning teams with the Red Wings.

Playing career
Dandenault was originally drafted as a right wing, but was converted into a defenceman during the 2001–02 season. After nine seasons with the Red Wings, who drafted him forty-ninth overall in the second round of the 1994 amateur draft, he played for HC Asiago in Italy in 2004–05 (due to the lockout) and upon his return to North America, he signed a 4-year contract with the Canadiens, his hometown team.

He has won the Stanley Cup three times (1997, 1998 and 2002), all with the Detroit Red Wings.

A free agent prior to the 2009–10 season, Dandenault was invited to the San Jose Sharks training camp.  However, Dandenault was among the final cuts as the Sharks decided to release him on September 27, 2009. On October 21, 2009, the Hartford Wolf Pack, American Hockey League affiliate of the New York Rangers, signed Dandeneault to a Professional Tryout Agreement.  On March 4, 2010, the Hartford Wolfpack released Dandenault from his Professional Tryout Agreement.

Personal life
Dandenault grew up in Gloucester, a suburb of Ottawa, Canada. 
Dandenault has one daughter, Amélia.
Dandenault has two brothers; Louis-Philippe Dandenault, and Alexandre Dandenault

International play

Dandenault represented Canada at the 2003 Men's World Ice Hockey Championships, where he won a gold medal. Dandenault recorded two goals and three assists in nine games.

Achievements
Won the Stanley Cup in 1997, 1998, and 2002 (Detroit Red Wings)
Won the 1991 Canadian Tire Cup All-Ontario Bantam AAA Championship as a 15 year old with the Gloucester Rangers ('75s).

Career statistics

Regular season and playoffs

International

References

External links 
 
 ESPN.com - NHL - Mathieu Dandenault
 NHLPA player biography

1976 births
Living people
Adirondack Red Wings players
Battle of the Blades participants
Canadian ice hockey defencemen
Detroit Red Wings draft picks
Detroit Red Wings players
French Quebecers
Hartford Wolf Pack players
Ice hockey people from Quebec
Montreal Canadiens players
Sherbrooke Faucons players
Sportspeople from Sherbrooke
Stanley Cup champions